"Junk of the Heart (Happy)" is a song by British rock band, the Kooks, and the second single and opening track from their 2011 album.

Release and reception 
AllMusic described the song as a "jangly, Dodgy-esque, summery opening title track". "Junk of the Heart" was released as the second single from Junk of the Heart in 2011 as a promo CD single. It was also released as a digital EP and was included on the 2017 greatest hits album The Best of... So Far.

The song reached No. 93 in Germany and No. 20 on the Billboard Alternative Songs chart in the US.

References 

The Kooks songs
2011 songs
Astralwerks singles